The 1979 FIBA European Championship, commonly called FIBA EuroBasket 1979, was the 21st FIBA EuroBasket regional basketball championship, held by FIBA Europe.  Twelve national teams affiliated with the International Basketball Federation entered the competition.  The competition was hosted by Italy. Mestre, Siena, Gorizia and Turin were the venues of the event.

Venues

Results

First round
In the preliminary round, the 12 teams were split up into three groups of four teams each.  The top two teams in each group advanced to the final round (with the score between them counting in the final round as well) while the bottom two were sent to the classification round to play for 7th to 12th Places (with the score between them counting in the classification round as well)

Group A – Mestre

|}

Group B – Siena

|}

Group C – Gorizia

|}

Classification round – Turin
In the classification round played the teams that finish 3rd and 4th in their preliminary-round groups.
Those teams played for the 7th to 12th Places.

|}

Final round – Turin
The Teams that finish their preliminary-round groups  in the 1st and 2nd places advanced to the final round.
The first and second in this group will go to the final while the third and fourth places will go to a 3rd-place match.

|}

Finals

3rd-place match
 99

 92

Final
19 June 1979
 98

 76

Final standings

Awards

Team rosters
1. Soviet Union: Sergei Belov (c), Anatoly Myshkin, Vladimir Tkachenko, Ivan Edeshko, Aleksander Belostenny, Stanislav Eremin, Valdemaras Chomičius, Alzhan Zharmukhamedov, Sergei Tarakanov, Vladimir Zhigili, Aleksander Salnikov, Andrei Lopatov (Coach: Alexander Gomelsky)

2. Israel: Mickey Berkowitz, Lou Silver, Motti Aroesti, Yehoshua "Shuki" Schwartz, Eric Menkin, Steve Kaplan, Boaz Yanai, Avigdor Moskowitz, Barry Leibowitz (c), Pinhas Hozez, Shai Sharf (Coach: Ralph Klein)

3. Yugoslavia: Krešimir Ćosić, Mirza Delibašić, Dražen Dalipagić, Dragan Kićanović, Zoran Slavnić, Žarko Varajić, Željko Jerkov, Rajko Žižić, Peter Vilfan, Mihovil Nakić, Ratko Radovanović, Duje Krstulović (Coach: Petar Skansi)

4. Czechoslovakia: Kamil Brabenec, Zdenek Kos, Stanislav Kropilak, Jiri Pospisil, Vojtech Petr, Vlastimil Klimes, Vlastimil Havlik, Jaroslav Skala, Zdenek Dousa, Peter Rajniak, Gustav Hraska, Zdenek Bohm (Coach: Pavel Petera)

References

Euro
1979 in Italian sport
1979
International basketball competitions hosted by Italy
Sports competitions in Turin
1970s in Turin
June 1979 sports events in Europe
History of Siena
Gorizia